Panagbenga Festival is a month-long annual flower occasion in Baguio, Philippines. The term is of Kankanaey origin, meaning "season of blooming". The festival, held in February, was created as a tribute to the city's flowers and as a way to rise from the devastation of the 1990 Luzon earthquake. The festival includes floats that are covered mostly with flowers, not unlike those used in Pasadena's Rose Parade. The festival also includes street dancing, presented by dancers clad in flower-inspired costumes, that is inspired by the Bendian, an Ibaloi dance of celebration that came from the Cordilleras.

The Bases Conversion Development Authority (BCDA), in collaboration with  he John Hay Poro Point Development Corporation's (JPDC) annual Camp John Hay Art Contest, gave its official logo from one of the entries: a spray of indigenous sunflowers from an artwork submitted by Trisha Tabangin, a student of the Baguio City National High School. The festival was set in February to boost tourism as it was considered as a time of inactivity between the busy days of Christmas season and the Holy Week and the summer season.

In 1996, archivist and curator Ike Picpican suggested that the festival be renamed Panagbenga, a Kankanaey term that means "a season of blossoming, a time for flowering".

In February 2020, the festival was initially postponed due to the threat of COVID-19, it was later then canceled in March 2020.

The festival was later cancelled again in 2021, citing the severity of the Pandemic in the city. The funds on both cancelled events were diverted to the health situation.

On March 6, 2022, the festival returned after the last 2 years of cancellation due to COVID-19 pandemic, but with limited events due to the ongoing crisis, and the events were exclusively funded by private companies and organisation donors, as government funds was diverted towards COVID health situation.

The event resumed in full in 2023, restored all events, including the crowd generating events liek botht he street dancing and float parades.

Activities
The month-long festival starts at the first day of the month of February, with opening activities organized by the city government and the private sector. Many activities are also celebrated throughout the month such as a landscape competition and cultural shows but the most crowd-generating events are in the last week of the festival which is the Street Dancing and Float Parade. After the parade, Session Road is closed for a week for the Session Road in Bloom activity which hosts a huge variety of stalls showcasing products locally and from other provinces.

References

External links
 Official website of Baguio
 

Tourist attractions in Baguio
Culture of Benguet
Flower festivals in the Philippines